Brian Goold-Verschoyle (5 June 1912 – 5 January 1942) was an Anglo-Irish member of the Communist Party of Great Britain who was recruited by the Soviet NKVD as a courier between its moles and their handlers in London. After being sent as a radio technician to Republican Spain, in 1937 he revealed his disaffection with the Moscow party line. Abducted by being lured aboard a Soviet freighter, he was smuggled to the USSR and died as a prisoner in the Gulag in 1942. He is one of only three Irish people who can be formally identified as victims of Stalin's Great Purge.

Early life
Brian Goold-Verschoyle was born in Dunkineely, County Donegal into a family from the Anglo-Irish gentry. His father, Hamilton Frederick Stuart Goold Verschoyle, a barrister, was a pacifist who supported Home Rule. 

After a childhood spent during the Irish War of Independence and Civil War and schooling at Portora Royal and Marlborough public schools he moved in 1929 to England at the age of 19. He took part in an apprenticeship in English Electric Works in Stafford. 

In 1931 he applied to join the Communist Party of Great Britain which prompted the MI5 to open a file on him. Eventually he became the party's leader in Stafford.

Soviet courier
Goold-Verschoyle became a Soviet spy after visiting his older brother Hamilton Neil Goold-Verschoyle and his Russian wife in Leningrad. The British domestic counterintelligence service, MI5, thought he was simply a "naïve supporter" of the Soviet Union. They remained unaware of the full truth until they learned years later from defecting Soviet spymasters Gen. Walter Krivitsky and Henri Pieck, that Brian Good-Verschoyle routinely couriered messages to the OGPU/NKVD and that he travelled in 1933, 1934 and 1935 to the USSR.

Brian Goold-Verschoyle also couriered classified papers from moles working within the British Government, particularly from John Herbert King, a British Foreign Office clerk. Goold-Verschoyle delivered the documents to former Roman Catholic priest and NKVD spymaster Theodore Maly, for whom he was the principle courier. He also worked as a courier for Dmitri Bystrolyotov. In 1936 Goold-Verschoyle, who had formerly worked as a technician, returned under an assumed name to Moscow to undergo wireless training. He was in love at the time with a German Jewish refugee named Lotte Moos and, to the dismay of his NKVD superiors, she accompanied him. Associated in the German Communist Party with the so-called Right Opposition, she was regarded as politically suspect. When Goold-Verschoyle completed his wireless training, he was assigned as a military advisor to the Second Spanish Republic, with express orders to break contact with Moos.

Disaffection and arrest
In Spain, Goold-Verschoyle was alarmed by what he perceived as the subversion of the republic by Soviet agents and by the local Communists they directed. He objected to the surveillance and prosecution of ideological dissent by the Soviet NKVD and the Servicio de Investigación Militar, the republic's Communist-controlled political police.  Concluding that Moscow had no interest in a socialist revolution it did not control completely, Goold-Verschoyle's letters to Lotte Moos and to his family in Ireland revealed a growing sympathy for the anti-Stalinist Workers' Party of Marxist Unification (POUM, the militia with which George Orwell served and which inspired his memoir Homage to Catalonia).

By April 1937, while working as a technician for the radio service of the Republican Army in Barcelona, Goold-Verschoyle had become sufficiently disillusioned that he asked to be released from active service. His commander told him that he would have to wait until a replacement could be found. Several days later, Goold-Verschoyle was assigned to repair radio equipment aboard a Soviet freighter. Once aboard he was arrested and, with two members of the Communist Youth League, he was shipped as a prisoner to the Soviet port of Sevastopol. There the Irishman and the two Komsomol members were handed over to the NKVD and transferred to the Lubianka Prison in Moscow.

Goold Vershoyle was sentenced to eight years of solitary confinement in the Gulag for counter-revolutionary Trotskyist activities. He died as a political prisoner in a Soviet concentration camp in Orenburg Oblast on 5 January 1942. 

Goold Vershoyle was survived by his brother, Hamilton Neil Goold-Verschoyle, who subsequently emigrated from Ireland to the Soviet Union, where he died in 1987, by his sister Mrs. Shiela Fitzgerald, and by three younger siblings.

In popular culture
Brian Goold-Verschoyle is mentioned in GRU defector Walter Krivitsky's memoir I Was Stalin's Spy and in Gulag survivor Karlo Stajner's memoir 7000 Days in Siberia.
 His childhood and later life are fictionalized – along with that of his oldest brother, fellow communist Hamilton Neil Goold-Verschoyle, and their sister, Sheila Fitzgerald  – in the 2005 historical novel, The Family on Paradise Pier by Dermot Bolger.
 Danilo Kiš's collection of short stories A Tomb for Boris Davidovich contains a short story entitled The Sow That Eats Her Farrow that is inspired by the life of Brian Goold-Verschoyle.

References

 Walter Krivitsky, I was Stalin's Spy, pp. 115–16. Ian Faulkner Publishing Ltd, Cambridge, 1992
 Barry McLoughlin, Left to the Wolves: Irish Victims of Stalinist Terror
 International Socialism – "Stalin's Irish Victims"
 Dermot Bolger, The Family on Paradise Pier

External links
 Verschoyle Official Site
 
BBC News – Irish Victims of Stalin uncovered 

1912 births
1942 deaths
20th-century Anglo-Irish people
Communist Party of Great Britain members
Foreign Gulag detainees
Interwar-period spies
Irish Comintern people
Irish communists
Irish expatriates in the Soviet Union
Irish people of Dutch descent
Irish people of the Spanish Civil War
Irish spies for the Soviet Union
Irish Trotskyists
Politicians from County Donegal
Prisoners and detainees of the Soviet Union
Prisoners who died in Soviet detention
Soviet spies against Western Europe